Carl F. Jordan is Professor Emeritus, Odum School of Ecology, University of Georgia.

Education 
Jordan graduated with a B.Sc. from the University of Michigan in 1958. In 1962, he enrolled in graduate school at Rutgers University and received his M.Sc. in Plant Ecology in 1964. He acquired his Ph.D. in 1966.

Career 
Jordan joined Howard Odum in an Atomic Energy Commission project in Puerto Rico in 1966 and applied the cycling concept to the dynamics of radioactive isotopes in the rain forest, for which he was awarded the Ecological Society of America’s Mercer award. In 1969, Jordan moved to Argonne National Laboratory where he continued to study radioactive pollution from nuclear power plants around Lake Michigan. In 1974, he led a project for the University of Georgia near San Carlos de Río Negro in the Amazon Region of Venezuela. During this time he focused on determining how forests of the Amazon survived on the nutrient-poor soils and could even flourish and support shifting cultivation. His research showed that nutrients from decaying organic matter on the forest floor recycled directly back into the roots of living trees. As long as the cycle was intact, the forest flourished, but destruction by agriculture or grazing cut the cycle and destroyed productive capacity.

In 1980, he returned to the University of Georgia. He began taking graduate students, while continuing his research in San Carlos, and expanding it to Brazil, Ecuador, and Thailand. Most notable projects were studies in Brazil of the Jari Plantation in Brazil, a pulp plantation of hundreds of square miles, and rehabilitation of the forests around the Carajas mines in central Amazonia. The primary concentration in all these studies was the importance of preserving the soil organic matter to keep the nutrient cycle intact and functioning.

In 1993, Jordan acquired a farm near Athens Georgia that had once been part of a pre-Civil cotton plantation and began research on more sustainable ways to manage organic agriculture. He originated the first University course in Georgia on organic farming, and opened the farm to tours and classes interested in sustainable agriculture. By 2017, more than 20,000 students had toured the farm. Jordan retired as Professor Emeritus in 2009.

Bibliography- Books 

 
 
 
 
 
 Jordan, C.F. (1995)  Conservation: Replacing Quantity with Quality as a Goal for Global Management. (Textbook). Wiley, N.Y.
 
 
 Montagnini F. and C.F. Jordan. (2005) Tropical Forest Ecology: The Basis for Management and Conservation.  Springer Verlag , Berlin
 Jordan, C. F. (2013).  An Ecosystem Approach to Sustainable Agriculture: Energy Use Efficiency in the American South.  Springer Verlag. Heidelberg

Selected Articles and Book Chapters

Courses Taught at the School of Ecology, University of Georgia 

 Tropical Ecological and Cultural Systems (1993-2000) (originated course)
 Agroforestry/ Agroecology (1995-2004) (originated course)
 Principles of Conservation Ecology and Sustainable Development II. (co instructor, (1994-2000)
 Conservation Seminar (2000-2009)
 Senior Seminar (1999-2002)
 Fertility and Pest Management in Organic Agriculture. co-instructor, (2007-2008)
 Organic Agriculture (2004-2013) (originated course)

Membership in Professional & Environmental Organizations 
 Sigma Xi

Selected Awards and Recognition 
 1973: Mercer Award, of the Ecological Society of America
 2008: Purpose Prize Fellow
 2011: Conservationist of the Year Award Oconee River Soil & Water Conservation District

References 

Year of birth missing (living people)
Living people
People from Maine
University of Georgia faculty
American ecologists